About a Girl is a Canadian comedy series which premiered on October 5, 2007 on Noggin's teen block, The N, in the U.S. and Global in Canada. It was the first scripted comedy on The N. The series ended with 13 episodes in only 1 season.

Plot
About a Girl centers around Amy Ryan, a college student who moves into a house off-campus when her dorm room turns out to be unacceptable. However, her new roommates are four guys. Things are not always smooth as she tries to either adjust to or change their habits and wrestles with her unrequited attraction to one of them.

Characters

The roommates
 Amy Ryan (Chiara Zanni) – A sophomore girl in college that believed would be not as difficult, "a walk in the park." After the college dorms are a dud, she had to move in with four guys (Jason, Dude, McRitchie, and Benny), rather than living in the college dorm rooms.
 Jason (Jesse Hutch) – One of the roommates that Amy lives with and who Amy has a crush on. The problem is he has a commitment issue in relationships.
 Dude (Sandy Robson) – He is usually eccentric and relaxed and gives his roommates some helpful insight. He is also the landlord for the house that he, Jason, McRitchie, Benny, and Amy live in.
 McRitchie (Braden Williams) – He does not think before he acts, disregarding the consequences that could happen with his actions. Also, he acts like Amy's bodyguard since he is protective of her.
 Benny (Marshall Porter) – He is the youngest of the roommates and also the cleanest, but does not pay attention to what his messy roommates do to the house. He also has a crush on Amy, but does not think he will get anything, but Amy is the one person that Benny seems comfortable talking to.

Other characters
 Erin (Kristie Marsden) – Amy's best friend that is all about boys and about having fun. She is straight forward and blunt when it comes to the truth, even if it may be considered harsh.
 Stacy – aka 'Laguna Bitch' (Chelan Simmons) – One of Amy's peer that is there to make fun of her in front of classmates.
 Mrs. Ryan (Lynda Boyd) – Amy's mother and also refers to her as "Crazy Lady".
 Felicia (Amber Borycki) – Jason's girlfriend, but they are always breaking up and then making up.
 Stan (aka "Stan the Man")  (Dustin Milligan) – Stan was the 5th roommate until he left to go on tour with a band called State of Shock.

Episodes

References

External links
 
 Archive of About a Girl website at TheN.com

2007 Canadian television series debuts
2008 Canadian television series endings
2000s Canadian teen sitcoms
2000s college television series
English-language television shows
Global Television Network original programming
The N original programming
Television shows filmed in Vancouver